Arnstein is a surname and a given name. Notable people with the name include:

Surname
 Benedikt Arnstein (1765–1841), Austrian dramatist
 Fanny von Arnstein (1758–1818), Austrian baroness and leader of society in Vienna
 Holly Blake-Arnstein (born 1985), singer from Dream, American pop girl group
Ira B. Arnstein (born Itzig Arenstein April 12, 1879 - September 13, 1956) was a musical composer, songwriter, and "chronic litigator."
 Karl Arnstein (1887–1974), Czech-American aviation engineer
 Margaret Arnstein (1904–1972), American nursing and public health advocate
 Nicky Arnstein (1879–1965), American professional gambler and con artist
 Sherry Arnstein (1930–1997), American public servant, an author of influential papers in participatory decision making

Given name
Arnstein Aassve (born June 19, 1968) is a Norwegian professor in demography
 Arnstein Arneberg (1882 – 1961), Norwegian architect
 Arnstein Johansen (1925 – 2013), Norwegian accordionist
Arnstein Finset (born 8 July 1947) is a Norwegian medical psychologist
 Arnstein Finstad (born 1978), Norwegian cross-country skier
 Arnstein Øverkil (1937 – 2014), Norwegian police chief and civil servant

See also

Aronstein
 Ornstein
 Orenstein
 Gorenstein
 Hornstein (surname)